was a town located in Kanoashi District, Shimane Prefecture, Japan.

As of 2003, the town had an estimated population of 6,124 and a density of 30.84 persons per km2. The total area was 198.57 km2.

On October 1, 2005, Muikaichi, along with the village of Kakinoki (also from Kanoashi District), were merged to create the town of Yoshika.

Notable people from Muikaichi
Hanae Mori, fashion designer

Dissolved municipalities of Shimane Prefecture